Sigler is a surname. Notable people with the surname include:

Bunny Sigler (born 1941), pop and R&B songwriter and record producer
Eisig D. Sigler or Eugen Relgis (1895–1987), Romanian writer, pacifist philosopher and anarchist militant
Franklin E. Sigler (1924–1995), American who received the Medal of Honor for his actions in the Iwo Jima campaign
Hollis Sigler (1948–2001), Chicago-based artist whose paintings addressed her life with breast cancer
Jamie-Lynn Sigler (born 1981), American actress and singer
John C. Sigler, Chairman of the Republican State Committee of Delaware, former President of the National Rifle Association
Kim Sigler (1894–1953), American politician
Maurice Sigler (1901–1961), American banjoist and songwriter
Scott Sigler, contemporary American author of science fiction and horror
Victoria Sigler (born 1951), judge of the Miami-Dade County Circuit Court
Travis Sigler (born 1993), Leather worker, mead maker, and entrepreneur. Co-Founded Wyrd Leatherworks and Meadery.

See also
Hot Sigler Springs, unincorporated community in Lake County, California
Seigler
Siegler
Zeigler (disambiguation)
Ziegler